Hanifa Nabukeera is a Ugandan business woman and a politician. She currently serves as a member of Parliament elect for Mukono District, affiliated with the National Unity Platform (NUP) political party. 

Nabukeera succeeded Kusasira Peace Kanyesigye Mubiru, whom she defeated in the general elections in 2021.

Background 
Nabukeera was born in Mukono District in Central Region of Uganda. She ran for parliament in 2011 and 2016, losing to Ronald Kibuule and  Kusasira Peace respectively. She was the second runner up for the 2016 Women Parliamentary race.

Nabukeer is serving in the 11th parliament for Mokono District and is affiliated with the NUP.

References 

21st-century Ugandan businesswomen
21st-century Ugandan businesspeople
Living people
Year of birth missing (living people)
21st-century Ugandan politicians